Liskeard Castle was a motte-and-bailey castle in the town of Liskeard in Cornwall. No extant remains survive of the castle.

Liskeard Castle was built between 1230 and 1240 by Richard of Cornwall and the castle was in ruins by 1337. It was repaired on two occasions, between 1341–42 and in 1361. When being repaired in 1377, the castle was described as 'a certain manor-house surrounded by a wall'. Repairs needed during the reign of Richard II (1377-1399) were neglected and by 1538 when visited by John Leland only a few insignificant remains were to be seen and the site was being used as a cattle pound. By the start of the 17th century it is assumed that only earthworks of the castle remained. Sir Richard Carew writing in 1602 concurred;

The remaining earthworks of the castle were eventually flattened due to industry. The location of where the castle once stood is today known as Castle Park.

References 

Castles in Cornwall
Motte-and-bailey castles
Former castles in England
Liskeard
Former buildings and structures in Cornwall